Celia Marie Israel (born July 15, 1964) is an American politician. She previously represented the 50th district in the Texas House of Representatives and was succeeded by State Representative James Talarico when she chose to run for Austin Mayor. She is a member of the Democratic Party.

Early life and career
Israel was raised in El Paso, Texas. She moved to the Austin area in 1982 to attend the University of Texas at Austin. After graduating with a degree in government, she served in Governor Ann Richards' administration. Israel is a licensed Texas realtor.

Political career
Israel won a special election on January 28, 2014, to represent the 50th district in the Texas House of Representatives to succeed Mark Strama. 

Israel was a member of the Legislative Study Group, the Women's Health Caucus, the Mexican American Legislative Caucus, and was a founding member of the Texas House LGBTQ Caucus. She previously served as Vice Chair of the Texas House Democratic Caucus, overseeing the Steering and Policy Committee. She proposed legislation to introduce online voter registration in Texas. In September 2019, she was chosen to lead the Texas House Democratic Campaign Committee, a political action committee tasked with electing more Democrats to the Texas House.

Israel served on numerous boards and committees focused on multimodal transportation, food scarcity, and empowering the next generation of female leaders. During her first term in the legislature, she was named Freshman of the Year by the Legislative Study Group, a Champion of Equality by Equality Texas, and a Progressive Champion by Progress Texas. In 2018, Israel was inducted into the Austin Women's Hall of Fame.

In January 2022, Israel announced that she would run for mayor of Austin in the 2022 Austin mayoral election. In the November 8 general election, she advanced to a runoff election against Kirk Watson and subsequently lost by a narrow margin.

Personal life
Israel lives with her wife, Celinda Garza, and their dogs, Pippa and Libby, in northeastern Travis County.

References

External links

1964 births
21st-century American politicians
21st-century American women politicians
21st-century LGBT people
American real estate brokers
Lesbian politicians
LGBT state legislators in Texas
Living people
Texas Democrats